Boris Movilă (born October 6, 1928 in Hîjdieni) is a writer from the Republic of Moldova.

He was born in Hîjdieni (Berezlogi, Orhei District). Movilă was the deputy president of the Comitetul pentru Cinematografie and redactor in chief of Moldova-Film. He is a leader of the Democratic Forum of Romanians in Moldova.

References

External links 
Iurie Colesnic, Un om ca o constantă a conştiinţei noastre

1928 births
Living people
Moldovan screenwriters
Moldovan writers
Moldovan male writers
Moldova State University alumni
People from Orhei District